RIDDLE syndrome is a rare genetic syndrome. The name is an acronym for Radiosensitivity, ImmunoDeficiency Dysmorphic features and LEarning difficulties.

Presentation
The features of this condition include:
 Facial dysmorphism
 Short stature
 Mild motor control and learning difficulties
 Mild ataxia
 Microcephaly
 Normal intelligence
 Conjunctival telangiectasia
 Recurrent sinus infections
 Decreased serum IgA
 Late onset of pulmonary fibrosis
 Increased alpha-fetoprotein
 Increased radiosensitivity

Genetics
This condition is due to mutations in the RNF168 gene. It is inherited in an autosomal recessive fashion. The gene encodes a ubiquitin ligase and is located on the long arm of chromosome 3 (3q29) on the Crick (minus strand).

Diagnosis

Differential diagnosis
The DDx is 
 Ataxia telangectasia
 Artemis deficiency
 Immunodeficiency 26 (PKCS gene deficiency)
 LIG4 syndrome
 Nijmegen breakage syndrome
 Severe combined immunodeficiency with Cernunnos
 X-linked agammaglobulinemia

Management

Epidemiology
This condition is rare. Only four cases have been described up to 2017.

History
This syndrome was first described by Stewart et al. 2007.

References 

Rare syndromes
Genetic diseases and disorders
Congenital disorders